Microsoft is a developer of personal computer software. It is best known for its Windows operating system, the Internet Explorer and subsequent Microsoft Edge web browsers, the Microsoft Office family of productivity software plus services, and the Visual Studio IDE. The company also publishes books (through Microsoft Press) and video games (through Xbox Game Studios), and produces its own line of hardware. The following is a list of the notable Microsoft software Applications.

Software development
 Azure DevOps
 Azure DevOps Server (formerly Team Foundation Server and Visual Studio Team System)
 Azure DevOps Services (formerly Visual Studio Team Services, Visual Studio Online and Team Foundation Service)
 BASICA
 Bosque
 CLR Profiler
 GitHub
Atom
GitHub Desktop
GitHub Copilot
npm
Spectrum
Dependabot
 GW-BASIC
 IronRuby
 IronPython
 JScript
 Microsoft Liquid Motion
 Microsoft BASIC, also licensed as:
 Altair BASIC
 AmigaBASIC
 Applesoft BASIC
 Commodore BASIC
 Color BASIC
 MBASIC
 Spectravideo Extended BASIC
 TRS-80 Level II BASIC
 Microsoft MACRO-80
 Microsoft Macro Assembler
 Microsoft Small Basic
 Microsoft Visual SourceSafe
 Microsoft XNA
 Microsoft WebMatrix
 MSX BASIC
 NuGet
 QBasic and QuickBASIC
 TASC (The AppleSoft Compiler)
 TypeScript
 VBScript
 Visual Studio
 Microsoft Visual Studio Express
 Visual Basic
 Visual Basic .NET
 Visual Basic for Applications
 Visual C++
 C++/CLI
 Managed Extensions for C++
 Visual C#
 Visual FoxPro
 Visual J++
 Visual J#
 Visual Studio Code
 Visual Studio Lab Management
Visual Studio Tools for Applications
 Visual Studio Tools for Office
 VSTS Profiler
 Windows API
 Windows SDK
 WordBASIC
 Xbox Development Kit

3D 
 3D Builder
 3D Scan (requires a Kinect for Xbox One sensor)
 3D Viewer
 AltspaceVR
 Bing Maps for Enterprise (formerly "Bing Maps Platform" and "Microsoft Virtual Earth")
 Direct3D
 Havok
 HoloStudio
 Kinect for Windows SDK
 Microsoft Mesh
 Paint 3D
 Print 3D
 Simplygon

Educational
 Bing
 Bing Bar
 Browstat
 Creative Writer
 Flip
 LinkedIn
 Microsoft Comic Chat
 Microsoft Math Solver
 Microsoft Pay (mobile payment and digital wallet service)
 Microsoft Silverlight
 MSN
 Office Online
 Outlook.com
 Skype
 Windows Essentials
 Microsoft Family Safety
 Microsoft Outlook Hotmail Connector
 OneDrive
 Windows Photo Gallery
 Yammer

Subscription services
 Microsoft 365
 Xbox Game Pass
 Xbox Game Pass Ultimate
 Xbox Live Gold

Maintenance and administration
 Microsoft Anti-Virus
 Microsoft Desktop Optimization Pack
 Microsoft Security Essentials
 Sysinternals utilities
 PageDefrag
Process Explorer
 Process Monitor
 SyncToy
 Windows Live OneCare
 Windows SteadyState

Operating systems 

 MS-DOS
 SB-DOS
 COMPAQ-DOS
 NCR-DOS
 Z-DOS
 86-DOS
 Microsoft Windows
 DOS-based
 Windows 1.0x
 Windows 2.0x
 Windows 2.1x
 Windows 3.0
 Windows 3.1x
 Windows for Workgroups 3.11
 Windows 9x
 Windows 95
 Windows 98
 Windows ME
 Windows NT
 Windows NT 3.1
 Windows NT 3.5
 Windows NT 3.51
 Windows NT 4.0
 Windows 2000
 Windows XP
 Windows Vista
 Windows 7
 Windows 8
 Windows RT
 Windows 8.1
 Windows 10
 Windows 11
 Windows Server
 Windows Server 2003
 Windows Server 2008
 Windows Server 2012
 Windows Server 2016
 Windows Server 2019
 Windows Server 2022
 Windows CE
 Windows Embedded
 Windows Mobile
 Windows Phone
 Windows Preinstallation Environment
 MSX-DOS
 OS/2
 HomeOS
 Midori
 MIDAS
 Singularity
 Xenix
 Zune

Productivity

Applications 

 Microsoft Office
 Microsoft Access
 Microsoft Excel
 Microsoft Lens (mobile)
 Microsoft OneNote
 Microsoft Outlook
 Microsoft PowerPoint
 Microsoft Project
 Microsoft Publisher
 Microsoft Sway
 Microsoft Visio
 Microsoft Word
 Office Mobile
 Office Remote (mobile)
 Microsoft Power Platform
 Microsoft Power BI
 Power Apps
 Power Automate
 Power Automate Desktop
 Power Virtual Agents
 Microsoft Dynamics
 Microsoft Dynamics 365 Finance
 Microsoft Dynamics 365 Business Central (previously Dynamics NAV, Navision)
 Microsoft Dynamics 365 Sales (previously Microsoft Dynamics CRM)
 Discontinued: Microsoft Dynamics C5, Microsoft Dynamics SL, Microsoft Dynamics GP superseded by Business Central
 Others
 Microsoft Teams
 Microsoft To Do
 Microsoft SwiftKey
 Microsoft Autofill
 Discontinued: Microsoft Expression Studio
 Discontinued: Microsoft Works

Suites

Microsoft Office 
 Microsoft Office 3.0
 Microsoft Office 95
 Microsoft Office 97
 Microsoft Office 2000
 Microsoft Office XP
 Microsoft Office 2003
 Microsoft Office 2007
 Microsoft Office 2010
 Microsoft Office 2013
 Microsoft Office 2016
 Microsoft Office 2019
 Microsoft Office 2021
 Microsoft 365 (Later)

Microsoft Office for Mac 
Microsoft Office 98 Macintosh Edition
 Microsoft Office 2001
 Microsoft Office v. X
 Office 2004 for Mac
 Microsoft Office 2008 for Mac
 Microsoft Office for Mac 2011
 Microsoft Office 2016 for Mac
 Microsoft Office 2019
Microsoft Office 2021

Servers 

 Microsoft Azure
 Microsoft BackOffice Server
 Microsoft BizTalk Server
 Microsoft Commerce Server
 Microsoft Content Management Server
 Microsoft Exchange Server
 Microsoft Forefront
 Exchange Online Protection
 Forefront Identity Manager
 Microsoft Forefront Threat Management Gateway
 Microsoft Forefront Unified Access Gateway
 Microsoft Host Integration Server
 Microsoft Identity Integration Server
 Microsoft Merchant Server
Microsoft Office PerformancePoint Server
 Microsoft Project Server
 Microsoft Office Project Portfolio Server
Microsoft SharePoint
 Microsoft Site Server
 Microsoft Speech Server
 Microsoft SQL Server
 Microsoft System Center
 System Center Advisor
 System Center Configuration Manager
 System Center Data Protection Manager
 System Center Essentials
 System Center Operations Manager
 System Center Service Manager
 System Center Virtual Machine Manager
 Microsoft Virtual Server
 Search Server
 Skype for Business Server
 Windows Admin Center

Video games

Xbox Game Studios 

 Xbox Game Studios Video Games
 Age of Empires series
 Banjo-Kazooie series
 Battletoads series
 Blinx series
 Conker series
 Crackdown series
 Crimson Skies series
 Fable series
 Forza series
 Fuzion Frenzy series
 Gears of War series (rebranded)
 Gears series (formerly Gears of War)
 Halo series
 Hellblade series
 Killer Instinct series
 Kinect Sports series
 Line Rider series
 Lips series
 MechAssault series
 Microsoft Flight Simulator series
 Midtown Madness series
 Minecraft series
 Monster Truck Madness series
 Motocross Madness series
 NFL Fever series
 NBA Inside Drive series
 Ori series
 Perfect Dark series
 Pillars of Eternity series
 Project Gotham Racing series
 Psychonauts series
 RalliSport Challenge series
 Rise of Nations series
 Scene It? series
 Shadowrun series
 State of Decay series
 The Bard's Tale series
 The Outer Worlds series
 Viva Piñata series
 Wastelands series
 Zoo Tycoon series

Bethesda Softworks 

 Bethesda Softworks Video Games
 Commander Keen series
 Dishonored series
 Doom series
 Fallout series
 Prey series
 Quake series
 Rage series
 The Elder Scrolls series
 The Evil Within series
 Wolfenstein series

Part of Windows 
Video games of Microsoft Windows
 Microsoft FreeCell
 Microsoft Hearts
 Microsoft Mahjong
 Microsoft Minesweeper
 Microsoft Solitaire Collection
 Microsoft Ultimate Word Games
Arcade game 
hexic series

Web services 
 Delve
 Microsoft Bookings
 Microsoft Forms
 Microsoft Planner
 Microsoft Stream
 Microsoft Sway
 Microsoft To Do
 Office on the web
 Outlook.com
 Outlook on the web

Windows components 

 Alarms & Clock
 Calendar (Windows)
 Character Map (Windows)
 ClickOnce
Command Prompt (formerly MS-DOS Prompt)
Cortana
 DirectX
 Disk Cleanup
 Ease of Access (formerly Utility Manager)
 Feedback Hub (Windows 10, Version 1607)
 File Explorer
 Internet Explorer
 Internet Information Services
 Hyper-V
 Microsoft Agent
 Microsoft Edge
 Microsoft Magnifier
 Microsoft Narrator
 Microsoft Notepad
 Microsoft Paint
 Microsoft Photos
 Microsoft Speech API
 Microsoft Store
 On-Screen Keyboard
 Paint 3D (Windows 10, Version 1703)
 Registry Editor
 Windows Calculator
 Windows Camera
 Windows Chat
 Windows Contacts
 Windows Defender
 Windows Disk Defragmenter (succeeded by Defragment and Optimize Drives)
 Windows Easy Transfer (formerly Files and Settings Transfer Wizard)
 Windows Installer
 Windows Media Player
 Windows Photo Viewer
 Windows PowerShell
 Windows Speech Recognition
 Windows Subsystem for Linux (WSL)
 Windows To Go
WordPad (formerly Microsoft Write)

Pre-installed Windows Games

Windows 7 
 Chess Titans
 FreeCell
 Hearts
 Internet-Backgammon
 Internet-Checkers
 Internet-Spades
 Mahjong Titans
 Minesweeper
 Purble Place
 Solitaire
 Spider Solitaire

Miscellaneous 
 Clipchamp
 Microsoft Bob
 Microsoft Home
 Microsoft Plus!

See also
 Microsoft and open source
 Microsoft hardware
 Outline of Microsoft

References

Software
Microsoft's